Gudaitis is a Lithuanian language family name. 

The surname may refer to:
Vincas Ramutis Gudaitis (born 1941)  a Lithuanian politician
Artūras Gudaitis (born 1993) a Lithuanian basketball player
Alexei Gudaitis, VP of ICT Group (Russia)

Lithuanian-language surnames